The 1951 VPI Gobblers football team represented the Virginia Polytechnic Institute in the 1951 college football season.  The team was led by their first-year head coach Frank Moseley and finished with a record of two wins and eight losses (2–8).

Schedule

Players
The following players were members of the 1951 football team according to the roster published in the 1952 edition of The Bugle, the Virginia Tech yearbook.

References

VPI
Virginia Tech Hokies football seasons
VPI Gobblers football